Wessels is a Dutch and Low German patronimic surname, where it was originally a Norman Viking surname. Notable people with the surname include:

Albert Wessels (1908–1991), South African industrialist
André Weßels (born 1981), German fencer
Andreas Wessels (born 1964), German football goalkeeper
Bredell Wessels (born 1995), Namibian cricketer
Charlotte Wessels (born 1987), Dutch heavy metal singer
Cornelius Hermanus Wessels (1851–1924), South African politician and statesman
Cornelius Wessels (1880–1964), Dutch Jesuit and historian
David Wessels (born 1982), South African rugby coach
 (1946–2017), Dutch billionaire, of VolkerWessels
Dirck Wessels (1638–1717), New Netherland colonist
Emile Wessels (born 1979), Namibian rugby player
Glenn Wessels (c. 1932 – 1982), South African-born American painter
Jaap Wessels (1939–2009), Dutch mathematician
Jan Gerard Wessels Boer (born 1936), Dutch plant taxonomist
Johan Wessels (born 1988), South African rugby player
John Wessels (1862–1936), Chief Justice of South Africa from 1932 to 1936
John Wessels (basketball) (1938–1994), American college basketball player
Kepler Wessels (born 1957), South African cricket
Leon Wessels (born 1946), South African lawyer, politician, and activist
Louis Wessels (born 1998), German tennis player
Peter Wessels (born 1978), Dutch  tennis player
Riki Wessels (born 1985), Australian cricketer
Robbie Wessels (born 1980), South African singer and actor
Roger Wessels (born 1961), South African golfer
SP Wessels (born 1992), South African rugby player
Stefan Wessels (born 1979), German football goalkeeper
Stefan Wessels (born 1984), Dutch basketball player
Susan Wessels-Webber (born 1977), South African field hockey player
Tom Wessels (born 1951), American  terrestrial ecologist
Ulla Wessels (born 1965), German analytic philosopher
Wessel Jacobus Wessels (1865-1945), Orange Free State Boer War general

As a middle name
Anna Wessels Williams (1863–1954), American pathologist

See also
Wessel (disambiguation)
Wessels, Swedish department store (1911–1977) founded by Th. Wessel
Wessels Islands
Wessels mine

Dutch-language surnames
Afrikaans-language surnames
Low German surnames
Patronymic surnames